Ronald Louis Washington (born April 29, 1952) is an American  former professional baseball shortstop. He played Major League Baseball (MLB) for the Los Angeles Dodgers, Minnesota Twins, Baltimore Orioles, Cleveland Indians, and Houston Astros.

Washington is currently the third base coach for the Atlanta Braves. He is also the former manager of the Texas Rangers, whom he took to the World Series in 2010 and 2011. Prior to managing the Rangers, Washington coached in the New York Mets and Oakland Athletics organizations. He is one of only three MLB players, along with U L Washington (no relation) and Frank White, who were products of the Royals Academy.

Playing career
Washington was signed by the Kansas City Royals on July 17, 1970. He spent the next ten seasons in the minor leagues with three different organizations (Royals, Mets, and Dodgers). He also played various seasons in the Mexican Pacific League during the winters throughout the 1970s and 1980s. He earned a brief September callup with the Los Angeles Dodgers in 1977 hitting .368 (7 for 19). He would not return to the major league level until 1981 with the Minnesota Twins where he would remain until 1986. He then played one season each for the Baltimore Orioles, Cleveland Indians, and Houston Astros before retiring from Triple-A Oklahoma City in 1990. He was a middle infielder for most of his career. On May 28, 1988, while playing for the Indians, Washington broke up Milwaukee Brewers pitcher Odell Jones' no-hit bid after  innings with a pinch-hit single.

Coaching career
Following his retirement as a player, Washington worked in the New York Mets organization for five years. After being hired as the Oakland Athletics first base coach in 1996 under his former Astros manager Art Howe, Washington then served as infield and third base coach for the A's between 1997 and 2006. As infield coach Washington has been credited for developing much of the A's young infield talent in the last decade, including six-time Gold Glover Eric Chavez, and former MVP and A's shortstop Miguel Tejada. In 2004, Chavez expressed his appreciation by giving Washington one of his Gold Glove trophies, signed "Wash, not without you." However, the trophy was lost during Hurricane Katrina in August 2005.

Washington is portrayed in the book Moneyball that relates how the A's competed having a small budget. Washington is shown in a positive light for the way he trained Scott Hatteberg to field first base for the first time in his career, but also as too old-fashioned and traditional in his lack of acceptance of general manager Billy Beane's sabermetric strategies. His character in the film adaptation of the book was played by actor Brent Jennings.

Managerial career
On November 6, 2006, the Texas Rangers announced that Washington had accepted their offer to manage the team replacing Buck Showalter, who was fired a month earlier. Washington beat out four other candidates for the job: Rangers bench coach Don Wakamatsu, then New York Mets third base coach Manny Acta, Nippon Ham Fighters manager Trey Hillman and former Rangers catcher John Russell.

At the beginning of the 2007 season, it was rumored that there was a rift between Washington and Rangers star Mark Teixeira. Asked about it, Washington responded,

Teixeira was traded to the Atlanta Braves in July 2007 and had been rumored to have been on the trading block before reports of tensions with Washington, as his agent, Scott Boras, had refused to negotiate a contract extension beyond the 2008 season. Reports also suggested tensions between Washington and catcher Gerald Laird. Questioned about the rumors, Washington conceded that the pressure he put on Laird was "a lot to put on a young kid ... (But) that's what we've got. He's got to grow up fast."

On March 17, 2010, Jon Heyman of Sports Illustrated reported that Washington tested positive for cocaine during the 2009 season and has acknowledged using cocaine.

In 2010, Washington became the second manager of the Rangers franchise (after Johnny Oates) to take his team to the postseason. On October 12, 2010, Washington became the first manager in franchise history to win a playoff series, with a 3–2 victory in the ALDS over the Tampa Bay Rays. On October 22, 2010, Washington's Rangers defeated the New York Yankees in the ALCS in six games, to advance to their first World Series in franchise history, before losing to the San Francisco Giants in five games. He also became the third African American to manage a team into a World Series, joining Cito Gaston, who managed the Toronto Blue Jays to the World Championship in the 1992 and 1993 World Series, and Dusty Baker, who managed the Giants in the 2002 World Series.

Referring to Washington, second baseman Ian Kinsler said: "I just love the way he never holds his emotion back, especially when he's managing. He hangs on every pitch, and it's great to know that your manager is in every single pitch and cares that much." In 2009 his salary was about $750,000. On November 4, 2010, Washington agreed to a two-year contract extension.

On October 15, 2011, Washington managed the Rangers to their second World Series in as many years, when the Rangers defeated the Detroit Tigers in the ALCS. The Rangers eventually lost to the St. Louis Cardinals in 7 games, after twice being one strike away from the title in game 6. On January 30, 2012, Washington agreed to another two-year contract extension. That year, he led the Rangers to a five-game lead in the race for the AL West title over the Oakland Athletics on September 24, but lost seven of the last nine games and the team was relegated to the inaugural AL Wild Card Game, which they lost 5–1 to the Baltimore Orioles.

On September 2, 2012, Washington earned his 507th win as a manager of the Texas Rangers, passing Johnny Oates for the second-most wins by a Rangers manager. On August 4, 2013, Washington passed Bobby Valentine for the most wins as a Rangers manager, at 582.

Following the conclusion of the 2014 season, Washington traveled to Japan to manage a team of MLB All-Stars playing against All-Stars of Nippon Professional Baseball in the 2014 Major League Baseball Japan All-Star Series.

Resignation and return to coaching 

On September 5, 2014, Washington announced his resignation as manager of the Rangers, citing personal reasons.  On September 11, 2014, it was announced by several media outlets that Ron Washington's resignation may be related to allegations of sexual assault against a reporter. On September 18, 2014, Washington announced that he had been having an extramarital affair, and that he had resigned to reconcile with his family. Washington's managerial record with the Rangers was 664–611 (.521), including four consecutive 90-win seasons (2010–13), and two pennants.  However, his 2014 squad was only 53–87 (.379).
Washington was hired as an infield coach by the Oakland Athletics on May 21, 2015.  He became the A's third base coach on August 24, 2015.

In October 2016, it was learned that Washington was a finalist for the Atlanta Braves managerial vacancy. The Braves opted to promote interim manager Brian Snitker instead, and then announced the hiring of Washington as their new third base coach, replacing Bo Porter.

Washington won his first World Series championship on November 2, 2021, as third-base coach for the Atlanta Braves.

Managerial record

References

Further reading

External links

Ron Washington at SABR (Baseball BioProject)
Ron Washington at Baseball Almanac
Ron Washington at Astros Daily
Ron Washington at Pura Pelota (Venezuelan Professional Baseball League)

1952 births
Living people
African-American baseball coaches
African-American baseball managers
African-American baseball players
Águilas de Mexicali players
Albuquerque Dukes players
Algodoneros de Guasave players
American expatriate baseball players in Mexico
Atlanta Braves coaches
Baltimore Orioles players
Baseball coaches from Louisiana
Baseball players from New Orleans
Cleveland Indians players
Daytona Beach Explorers players
Drugs in sport in the United States
Gulf Coast Royals players
Houston Astros players
Jacksonville Suns players
Los Angeles Dodgers players
Major League Baseball first base coaches
Major League Baseball second basemen
Major League Baseball shortstops
Major League Baseball third base coaches
Major League Baseball third basemen
Minnesota Twins players
Oklahoma City 89ers players
Oakland Athletics coaches
Rochester Red Wings players
Rojos del Águila de Veracruz players
San Antonio Dodgers players
San Jose Bees players
Texas Rangers managers
Tidewater Tides players
Tigres de Aragua players
American expatriate baseball players in Venezuela
Toledo Mud Hens players
Tucson Toros players
Venados de Mazatlán players
Waterbury Dodgers players
Waterloo Royals players
West Palm Beach Tropics players
21st-century African-American people
20th-century African-American sportspeople